This is a list of Canadian films which were released in 1981:

See also
 1981 in Canada
 1981 in Canadian television

1981
1981 in Canadian cinema
Canada